The Women's 10 metre platform diving event was held on 11 October 2010 at the Dr. S.P.M. Aquatics Complex.

Results
Green denotes finalists

References
 Reports

Aquatics at the 2010 Commonwealth Games
2010 in diving
Comm